The Samsung SGH-F480 (marketed as Tocco in many English-spoken countries, or Player Style in France) is a touch-screen mobile phone announced in February 2008 and released in May 2008 by Samsung Mobile. The F480 is available from Orange, T-Mobile, 3, Virgin Mobile, Telstra, Optus, and O2 mobile carriers under both contract and prepaid plans. Models without a SIM lock are also available. It comes in three colours: black, pink, and gold.

In Asian markets it was sold under model number SGH-488. the U.S. the Samsung T919 Behold was sold which is mostly the same but has a 3.0-inch display, an accelerometer, and GPS support.

Features
The devices uses a  haptic TFT touch screen that can render 256,000 colors. Software-wise it uses Samsung's proprietary "TouchWiz UI" which was made as the replacement of the previous "Croix UI" that appeared on phones such as the F700. The device has a slimline and compact hardware design with a metallic back and sides. Compared to the F490 introduced at the same time, the F480 lacks a 3.5 mm headphone jack and is smaller in size.

The phone operates on the GSM and EDGE standards at 900, 1800, and 1900 MHz bands. The F480 supports 3G HSDPA data at 7.2 megabits per second on the 850 MHz band. It offers a WAP 2.0-compliant web browser, and uses MIDP 2.0 as its Java support platform. This allows installing the Opera Mini browser, which is more up-to-date and advanced than the native browser. The latter is still good for quick access to the mobile Internet.

The phone features a 5-megapixel camera with LED flash, auto-focus, face recognition, smile mode, 4× digital zoom, and video recording capability. It allows users to edit photos and videos, and add effects to photos. The device also contains music-recognition software.  With up-to-date firmware, it can support 16-gigabyte microSD cards. Bluetooth support is included.

The F480 uses a 1,000 mAh lithium-ion battery that provides up to three hours of talk time or 250 hours of standby time.

Reception
The F480 Tocco was a considerable success for Samsung. Samsung claimed that the F480 Tocco was the best-selling contract mobile phone in the UK in the second quarter of 2008.

A slightly improved version called SGH-F480i was introduced in February 2009. Other devices would also be launched extending the Tocco name: the full-touch budget Samsung S5230 ("Tocco Lite" or "Star") and the sliding touch Samsung S8300 ("Tocco Ultra" or "UltraTOUCH").

Related pages

LG Cookie
 Samsung T919 Behold
 Samsung i900 Omnia
Samsung Solstice
 Sony Ericsson C902
 Nokia 5800 XpressMusic
 Samsung U900 Soul
Samsung P520 Giorgio Armani
Samsung S8000 Jet

References

F480
Mobile phones introduced in 2008